In graph theory, an edge-graceful labeling is a type of graph labeling for simple, connected graphs in which no two distinct edges connect the same two distinct vertices and no edge connects a vertex to itself. 

Edge-graceful labelings were first introduced by Sheng-Ping Lo in his seminal paper.

Definition 

Once a labeling of the edges is given, a vertex  of the graph is labeled by the sum of the labels of the edges incident to it, modulo . Or, in symbols, the induced labeling on the vertex  is given by

A graph  is said to be edge-graceful if it admits an edge-graceful labeling.

Examples

Cycles 

Consider the cycle with three vertices, . This is simply a triangle. One can label the edges 1, 2, and 3, and check directly that, along with the induced labeling on the vertices, this gives an edge-graceful labeling. Similar to paths,  is edge-graceful when  is odd and not when  is even.

Paths 

Consider a path with two vertices, . Here the only possibility is to label the only edge in the graph 1. The induced labeling on the two vertices are both 1. So  is not edge-graceful.

Appending an edge and a vertex to  gives , the path with three vertices. Label the two edges in the following way: the edge  is labeled 1 and  labeled 2. This is an edge-graceful labeling and so  is edge-graceful.

Similarly, one can check that  is not edge-graceful.

In general,  is edge-graceful when  is odd and not edge-graceful when it is even. This follows from a necessary condition for edge-gracefulness.

A necessary condition 

In symbols:

This is referred to as Lo's condition in the literature. This follows from the fact that the sum of the labels of the vertices is twice the sum of the edges, modulo . This is useful for disproving a graph is edge-graceful. For instance, one can apply this directly to the path and cycle examples given above.

Further selected results 

The Petersen graph is not edge-graceful.
The star graph  (a central node and m legs of length 1) is edge-graceful when m is even and not when m is odd.
The friendship graph  is edge-graceful when m is odd and not when it is even.
 Regular trees,  (depth n with each non-leaf node emitting m new vertices) are edge-graceful when m is even for any value n but not edge-graceful whenever m is odd.
The complete graph on n vertices, is edge-graceful unless n is singly even, .
The ladder graph is never edge-graceful.

References 

Graph theory objects